The Columbia College Koalas are the athletic teams that represent Columbia College, a women's liberal arts institution located in Columbia, South Carolina, in intercollegiate sports as a member of the National Association of Intercollegiate Athletics (NAIA), primarily competing in the Appalachian Athletic Conference (AAC) since the 2011–12 academic year. The Koalas previously competed in the Southern States Athletic Conference (SSAC; formerly known as Georgia–Alabama–Carolina Conference (GACC) until after the 2003–04 school year) from 2005–06 to 2010–11; and in the defunct Eastern Intercollegiate Athletic Conference (EIAC) during the 2004–05 school year.

Varsity teams
Columbia College competes in 15 intercollegiate varsity sports: Men's sports include cross country, golf, soccer, swimming, tennis and track & field; while women's sports include basketball, cross country, golf, soccer, softball, swimming, tennis, track & field and volleyball.

Men's sports debuted when the college became co-educational in 2020, beginning athletic competition in the 2021 fall season.

References

External links